Connections is a compilation album and a studio album produced by A. R. Rahman. It was published by his label K.M. Musiq Ltd. under License to different record labels for different editions. Retail Edition Pack contains his handpicked favourites from various films that He worked and was released by Universal Music Group  and the Collector's edition, a 2-disc edition, contains all his original compositions in Disc 1 which were composed during various stages of his life. And Disc 2 contains various instrumentals and scores from his movies. It was released by Sony Music. Track Jiya se Jiya (Original Version) featuring Karthik and Raqueeb Alam is available only on Nokia Edition released on Nokia Xpress Music devices and Ovi Music. Jiya se Jiya (Rockstar Version) and Jiya se Jiya (Club Mix) were released on Retail Edition by Universal Music Group. Track 'Mosquito' on Nokia Edition and 'Macchar Khan' on Collector's Edition are the same tracks performed by Sabir Khan.

Development
A. R. Rahman stated that it was developed at various stages of his life. The album has songs of various film such as Rang De Basanti, Dil Se.. and Ada... A Way of Life. It also has Rahman's first English-language release "Pray for Me Brother" and his immensely popular and cult classic "Bombay Theme".

Release
In October 2008, Nokia Edition of this album was released as an exclusive gift along with Xpressmusic 5800 in India.

The retail album was released on Universal Music on 27 June 2009, it is also available in a Deluxe Edition pack that features the "Rockstar Version" video of "Jiya Se Jiya". For the first time ever Rahman appears in a zingy new avatar grooving alongside ace-percussionist Sivamani. The Retail Edition was reissued by Wrasse Records, a Label that Licenses Universal Music's World Music Albums in the United States and the UK. The Reissued Version contains additional 3 tracks, 'Jai Ho' from Slumdog Millionaire, 'Jai Ho! (You are my Destiny)' and 'Sajna' from Couples Retreat.

In 2011, another 2 CD version was released. It included all 8 Nokia Edition tracks along with a compilation CD of 10 A.R.Rahman hits.

Track listing (Nokia Edition, 2008)

Track listing (Retail Edition, 2009)

Track listing (Collector's Edition, 2011)

Composer Note
"Connections is a very special compilation of songs done at various stages of my life. They all mean a lot to me and I hope the album will be enjoyed by all."

References 

2009 albums
A. R. Rahman albums
Universal Music Group compilation albums